{{DISPLAYTITLE:C16H28N4O8}}
The molecular formula C16H28N4O8 may refer to:

 Alcaligin 
 DOTA (chelator), also known as tetraxetan

Molecular formulas